Thomas Townsend may refer to:
 Thomas Townsend (bishop), Irish Anglican bishop
 Captain Thomas Townsend, early settler of the American Colonies
 Thomas J. Townsend, surveyor, ferry operator, politician and emigration agent from Wisconsin
 Tommy Townsend, American football punter
 Tom Townsend, English bridge player and writer
 Tom Townsend, secret identity of Captain Flag

See also
 Thomas Townshend (disambiguation)